Dr. Partha Banerjee is a human rights activist, writer, educator, public speaker, media critic, and musician. Born and raised in Kolkata (Calcutta), Banerjee now lives in New York with frequent visits to India.

Biography

Banerjee spent the first half of his life in India, and the second half in the U.S.

Life in India

Banerjee grew up in Calcutta (now Kolkata). His father Jitendra Nath Banerjee (1924-2017) was a grassroots political organizer in Rashtriya Swayamsevak Sangh (RSS) and its erstwhile political wing Bharatiya Jana Sangh (now Bharatiya Janata Party or BJP). Banerjee received his first training in political organizing from his father while with RSS, and later by his maternal uncle Buddhadev Bhattacharjee who belonged to Congress Party. Banerjee quit RSS out of ideological disillusionment with the organization's militant, fundamentalist doctrine, yet without disavowing his deep roots in ecumenical and secular Hinduism.

In 1985, Banerjee came to USA as an international student in biology.

Educator and Organizer

Banerjee has been a human rights activist and organizer with a focus on immigrants and workers. Since moving to New York, he has worked first as a grassroots immigrant rights organizer, and then as a labor educator. He has also written major articles to champion the rights of women especially women in the Indian subcontinent.

Life in USA

In 1985, after teaching biology at a remote, rural college in West Bengal for four years, Banerjee left for USA to pursue a PhD in biological sciences. He earned his second master's degree from Illinois State University, and then went on to earn his doctorate degree in plant biology from Southern Illinois University at Carbondale. In 1992, he earned his PhD with a dissertation research award, and started working as a postdoctoral research scientist with the state system in Albany, New York.

In 1999, Dr. Banerjee quit his science career, and moved to New York City to pursue his third master's degree, this time from the Graduate School of Journalism at Columbia University. He received a prestigious Sevellon Brown award for his understanding of American media and ethics. He also received a Scripps-Howard fellowship to travel with a group of fellow students to Israel, Palestine and Jordan, to report on religions of that region.

After a brief stint as a science journalist, and producing a number of two-minute-long stories for ScienCentral, an ABC TV-affiliate company in New York, he began working for a grassroots immigrant rights group New Immigrant Community Empowerment, in the aftermath of the tragedies of September 11, 2001. NICE became known for its work against bigotry and hate crimes. Later, New Jersey Immigration Policy Network, a statewide policy organization, hired him as its executive director. Banerjee organized a number of immigrant rights conferences, and put together an umbrella coalition of rights and justice groups.

In 2005–2006, New York Civil Liberties union chose Dr. Banerjee as one of its five plaintiffs on a nationally publicized lawsuit to challenge against the post-9/11 subway bag searches run by the New York Police Department.

In 2007, Dr. Banerjee was employed by the Harry Van Arsdale Center for Labor Studies at Empire State College in New York to teach English writing, immigration and diversity, and media to its labor union workers, and also as an Outreach Coordinator. In 2011, Dr. Banerjee was hired to work as a labor educator and educational program developer at the Joint Industry Board of the Electrical Industry; he has held the position since. One of his major responsibilities has been to design and teach an April-to-November, interactive, critical-thinking labor workshop on various political, social and economic subjects.

Writer

Publications in the U.S., India and Bangladesh have published Dr. Banerjee's books and articles in English and Bengali languages. He has written both professional and popular articles on a diverse array of subjects. He has also translated Bengali short stories, poetry and songs. A Bangladesh-based, online literary magazine has published Ghotikahini, his Bengali-language memoir, in weekly segments. Ghotikahini is now published as a 350-page book (December, 2015) by Ravan Prakashana, Calcutta, India.
 In February 2018, his translation of Bengali short stories Music Box and Moonshine came out.

Educator 
Dr. Banerjee has taught for many years – first in India, and then for over thirty years in the U.S. Since 2007, he has been teaching as the labor educator at IBEW Local 3 and Joint Board of Electrical Industries in New York. His critical-thinking interactive workshops are enormously popular: he has taught on political, economic, social, scientific, and environmental subjects. He speaks fluently in English and Bengali.

Public Speaker 
Dr. Banerjee has earned reputation as a public speaker addressing large and small gatherings in indoor and outdoor settings. In April 2019, he was the keynote speaker at IBEW Local 3's Annual Scholarship Breakfast program for college-bound children of the union members.

Work with Media

Noted publications such as the New York Times, CNN, the Progressive, Outlook India, Ananda Bazar Patrika, Ebela, The Statesman and Aajkaal have published his letters and articles, or quoted him on various issues, especially his work on human rights and rights and justice for underprivileged immigrants. A number of Bengali-language newspapers from USA have published his articles and interviews.

Media Criticism and Ethics

A student of Noam Chomsky, world-renowned intellectual and critic of U.S. foreign policy and corporate media, Dr. Banerjee has written extensively on political and economic interests of mainstream media. His interview with Noam Chomsky has been picked up by many news outlets and blogs. Dr. Banerjee's association with Noam Chomsky is well known across the peace and justice community. In 2005, after having worked as the post-production translator of Oscar-winning documentary Born into Brothels, he came out with a strong critique of the movie, pointing out its "ethical and stylistic flaws."

Bengali and Indian Diaspora

Dr. Banerjee has remained involved with the Bengali and Indian immigrant communities. Voice of America's Bengali radio section has found him as a speaker on many of their shows especially those pertaining to immigrants and human rights.

Musician and Cultural Activist

Banerjee wrote and spoke—both in English and Bengali—on the subjects of cultural erosion and "kitsch," and drew illustrations from the life and creations of Nobel Poet Rabindranath Tagore.

Recording Tagore's Music

In 2012, Banerjee published "Aro Ektu Bosho" (Stay a Little More), his solo CD album of Tagore songs.

Political philosophy: Second circle

Dr. Banerjee began his political career in India as a member of right wing Rashtriya Swayamsevak Sangh (RSS) because of familial connections: his father has been a lifelong activist of the organization. He quit RSS and its political wing [Bharatiya Janata Party] (BJP) and student wing Akhil Bharatiya Vidyarthi Parishad (ABVP), because of ideological disillusionment. His book on RSS and BJP was a product of his years of association with the groups. After working informally with left-leaning organizations both in India and USA, he developed his own, unique political and social doctrine. He designed a broad-based, coalition-building model to bring together all the moderate and non-violent, working men and women—both from the left and right—to a common platform. He calls it the Second Circle, as illustrated in his publication Second Circle—Middle Majority of the Working People

Books and journal articles

Books
(1) Banerjee, Partha. 2018. Music Box and Moonshine. Rubric Publishing, New Delhi. .
(2) Banerjee, Partha. 2015. Ghotikahini. Ravan Prakashana, Calcutta, India. .
(3) Banerjee, Partha. 1998. In the Belly of the Beast: Hindu Supremacist RSS and BJP of India – An Insider's Story. Ajanta Books International, Delhi, India.
(4) Banerjee, Partha. 2005. Straight Terror Warped Terror, Half Terror Full Terror. Ankur Publishers, Dhaka, Bangladesh (in Bengali).

Books in Press: (1) Rainforest and Raging Fire. Rubric Publishing, New Delhi. (2) Gandhi's Killers India's Rulers – RBE Books, Kolkata. (3) The Kolkata I Loved (in Bengali) – Gangchil Publications, Kolkata. (4) Bengali book of poetry – Book Terminus, Kolkata.

Peer-reviewed Journal Articles (outside of science)

(1) Banerjee, Partha. A Matter of Extreme Cruelty: Bride Burning and Dowry Deaths in India. Injustice Studies, 1(1), 1997. 
(2) Banerjee, Partha. Second Circle: Middle Majority of the Working People: A Simple Spin Wheel Model to Build Alliance and Power across the Soft "Left and Right". International Journal of the Humanities, 9(2), 2011.
(3) Banerjee, Partha, et al. The Unprecedented Income Inequality in America. Published on website of 19 July 2017.

Selected Science Articles

(1) Banerjee, Partha. Successful isolation and growth of tissue cultures of Pluteus species
(2) Banerjee, Partha. Preliminary observations on germination of Pluteus basidiospores
(3) Banerjee, Partha. A Systematic and Phylogenetic Study of the Genus Pluteus with Special Reference to Section Pluteus

References 

Year of birth missing (living people)
Living people
Indian human rights activists